is a Japanese volleyball player. He competed in the men's tournament at the 1976 Summer Olympics.

References

1953 births
Living people
Japanese men's volleyball players
Olympic volleyball players of Japan
Volleyball players at the 1976 Summer Olympics
People from Tokyo
Sportspeople from Tokyo
Asian Games medalists in volleyball
Asian Games silver medalists for Japan
Medalists at the 1978 Asian Games
Volleyball players at the 1978 Asian Games
20th-century Japanese people